Middlebury College is a private liberal arts college in Middlebury, Vermont. Founded in 1800 by Congregationalists, Middlebury was the first operating college or university in Vermont. The college currently enrolls 2,858 undergraduates from all 50 states and 74 countries and offers 44 majors in the arts, humanities, literature, foreign languages, social sciences, and natural sciences, as well as joint engineering programs with Columbia University, Dartmouth College, and Rensselaer Polytechnic Institute. In addition to its undergraduate liberal arts program, the school also has graduate schools, the Middlebury College Language Schools, the Bread Loaf School of English, and the Middlebury Institute of International Studies at Monterey, as well as its C.V. Starr-Middlebury Schools Abroad international programs.  It is the among the Little Ivies, an unofficial group of academically selective liberal arts colleges, mostly in the northeastern United States.
 
Middlebury is known for progressive teaching and thought. The college was the first American institution of higher education to award a bachelor's degree to an African-American, graduating Alexander Twilight in the class of 1823. Middlebury was also one of the first formerly all-male liberal arts colleges in New England to become a coeducational institution, following the trustees' decision in 1883 to accept women. In 1965, the college established the first undergraduate Environmental Studies program in the United States, and, in 2019, publicly committed to full divestment of the college's endowment from the fossil fuel industry through its Energy2028 initiative.

Middlebury's 31 varsity teams are the Middlebury Panthers and compete in the NCAA Division III's NESCAC conference.

History

19th century

Middlebury received its founding charter on November 1, 1800, as an outgrowth of the Addison County Grammar School, which had been founded three years earlier in 1797. The college's first president—Jeremiah Atwater—began classes a few days later, making Middlebury the first operating college or university in Vermont. One student named Aaron Petty graduated at the first commencement held in August 1802. The college's founding religious affiliation was loosely Congregationalist. Yet the idea for a college was that of town fathers rather than clergymen, and Middlebury was clearly "the Town's College" rather than the Church's. Chief among its founders were Seth Storrs and Gamaliel Painter, the former credited with the idea for a college and the latter as its greatest early benefactor. In addition to receiving a diploma upon graduation, Middlebury graduates also receive a replica of Gamaliel Painter's cane. Painter bequeathed his original cane to the college and it is carried by the college President at official occasions including first-year convocation and graduation. Alexander Twilight, class of 1823, was the first black graduate of any college or university in the United States; he also became the first African American elected to public office, joining the Vermont House of Representatives in 1836. At its second commencement in 1804, Middlebury granted Lemuel Haynes an honorary master's degree, the first advanced degree ever bestowed upon an African American.

In 1883, the trustees voted to accept women as students in the college, making Middlebury one of the first formerly all-male liberal arts colleges in New England to become a coeducational institution. The first female graduate—May Belle Chellis—received her degree in 1886. As valedictorian of the class of 1899, Mary Annette Anderson became the first African-American woman elected to Phi Beta Kappa.

20th century
The college's centennial in 1900 began a century of physical expansion beyond the three buildings of Old Stone Row. York and Sawyer designed the Egbert Starr Library (1900), a Beaux-Arts edifice later expanded and renamed the Axinn Center, and Warner Hall (1901). Growth in enrollment and the endowment led to continued expansion westward. McCullough Hall (1912) and Voter Hall (1913) featured gymnasium and laboratories, respectively, adopting Georgian Revival styling while confirming the campus standard of grey Vermont limestone, granite, and marble.

The national fraternity Kappa Delta Rho was founded in Painter Hall on May 17, 1905. Middlebury College abolished fraternities in the early 1990s, but the organization continued on campus in the less ritualized form of a social house. Due to a policy at the school against single-sex organizations, the house was forced to coeducate during the same period as well. The German Language School, founded in 1915 under the supervision of then-President John Martin Thomas, began the tradition of the Middlebury College Language Schools. These Schools, which take place on the Middlebury campus during the summer, enroll about 1,350 students in the Arabic, Chinese, French, German, Hebrew, Italian, Japanese, Portuguese, Russian, and Spanish Language Schools.

Middlebury President Paul Dwight Moody began the American tradition of a National Christmas Tree in 1923 when the college donated a 48-foot balsam fir for use at the White House. The tree was illuminated when Vermont native Calvin Coolidge flipped an electric switch in the first year of his presidency. The Bread Loaf School of English, Middlebury's graduate school of English, was established at the college's Bread Loaf Mountain campus in 1920. The Bread Loaf Writers' Conference was established in 1926. In 1978, the Bread Loaf School of English expanded to include a campus at Lincoln College, Oxford University. In 1991, the School expanded to include a campus at St. John's College in New Mexico, and to the University of North Carolina, Asheville, in 2006. The C.V. Starr-Middlebury Schools Abroad began in 1949 with the school in Paris; they now host students at 38 sites in Argentina, Brazil, China, Cameroon, Chile, France, Germany, India, Italy, Japan, Jordan, Morocco, Russia, Spain, Uruguay, United Kingdom, and Puerto Rico. The Center for Medieval and Renaissance Studies was founded as an educational charity in 1975 by Drs John and Sandy Feneley in Oxford, England, establishing a facility at St. Michael's Hall in 1978, including the Feneley Library, and close links with Keble College, Oxford; in 2014, CMRS became part of Middlebury College Schools Abroad as Middlebury-CMRS, offering U.S. undergraduates an Oxford Humanities Research Program and Middlebury Museum Studies in Oxford. In 1965, Middlebury established its Environmental Studies program, creating the first undergraduate Environmental Studies program in the U.S. Nationally affiliated fraternities were abolished in 1990; some chose to become co-educational social houses which continue today.

21st century 

In May 2004, an anonymous benefactor made a $50 million donation to Middlebury. It is the largest cash gift the school has ever received. The donor asked only that Middlebury name its recently built science building, Bicentennial Hall, after outgoing President John McCardell Jr. As of July 2014, Middlebury's endowment stood at approximately $1 billion. Campus expansion has continued and recently completed projects have included new libraries, dorms, academic buildings, and athletic facilities.

In 2005, Middlebury signed an affiliation agreement with the Monterey Institute of International Studies, a graduate school in Monterey, California. On June 30, 2010, the Monterey Institute was officially designated as a graduate school of Middlebury College.

In the summer of 2008, Middlebury and the Monterey Institute of International Studies launched a collaborative program to offer summer language immersion programs in Arabic, Chinese, French, German, Italian, and Spanish to middle and high school students through the Middlebury-Monterey Language Academy (MMLA). In January 2014, as part of a new brand identity system, Middlebury announced that the Monterey Institute of International Studies would be renamed the Middlebury Institute of International Studies at Monterey.

In June 2010, Middlebury announced that it had a 40% stake in a joint-venture with K12 Inc. to build online language software to be marketed under the brand "Middlebury Interactive Languages." The initial release will cover basic Spanish and French and be aimed at high school students.

By 2013, the French language was available online to schools for $12,000 annually. Elementary schools were eligible, starting at the third grade. Students proceed at their own pace with a local teacher giving individual guidance.

Middlebury has a pledge to attain carbon neutrality by 2016. As part of this, a biomass gasification plant was built on college land as well as solar and wind installations to reduce reliance on traditional fuel sources and cut carbon emissions.

On March 2, 2017, political scientist Charles Murray was shouted down by students and outside agitators at the campus, and prevented from speaking at the McCullough Student Center. Murray had been named a white nationalist by the Southern Poverty Law Center, and has been criticized for a teenaged incident in 1960 where he burned a cross on a hill in his hometown of Newton, Iowa, an act which Murray himself later characterized as "incredibly dumb". After the protest, Murray's talk was moved to Wilson Hall and published online; however, after the talk there was a violent attack by protesters who attempted to obstruct and damage the vehicle of Bill Burger (the Vice President of communications at Middlebury College), Murray, and Middlebury professor Allison Stanger; Stanger was injured in the attack, requiring her hospitalization with a neck injury and concussion. Middlebury students alleged that College Public Safety officers instigated violence against students, and that Bill Burger hit students with his car as he drove Murray away from the building. Middlebury President Laurie L. Patton responded after the event, saying the school would respond to the clear violations of college policy by students that occurred. Some students (and faculty) felt that by refusing to allow Murray to speak, and by injuring Stanger, the Middlebury College student community "trod all over the ideas of free speech this country was founded upon". The school took disciplinary action against 74 students for their involvement in the incident.

In the spring of 2017, the college also faced allegations of racial profiling, after a student was faced with disciplinary action despite evidence that they had not been present at the protest. Middlebury released a statement asserting that such allegations had been investigated that the college had determined that no such racial profiling had taken place. The statement also noted than an investigation had refuted the anonymous allegations against Burger.

On January 26, 2019, the Middlebury Board of Trustees unanimously endorsed the Energy2028 Plan, which most notably involved full divestment of the school's endowment from the fossil fuel industry.  Recognizing the profound threat of climate change, the plan includes fossil fuel divestment, a massive shift towards renewable energy, an energy consumption reduction and internal carbon tax, and a reinvigoration of environmental education initiatives on campus. The plan came as a result of generations of student activism, particularly on the part of the Divest Middlebury campaign, an initiative founded in 2012 by the Middlebury Sunday Night Environmental Group (SNEG).

Academics

Founded in 1800, the college enrolls approximately 2,500 undergraduates from all 50 states and 70 countries. The college offers 40 undergraduate departments and programs. Middlebury was the first institution of higher education in the United States to offer an environmental studies major, establishing the major in 1965. Middlebury College is accredited by the New England Commission of Higher Education.

The most popular undergraduate majors at Middlebury by number of 2021 graduates were:
Econometrics & Qualitative Economics (81)
Computer Science (47)
Political Science & Government (47)
Environmental Studies (45)
Neuroscience (37)

The academic year follows a 4–1–4 schedule of two four-course semesters in the autumn and spring plus what is known as a "Winter Term" session in January. The Winter Term, often called "J-Term" for January Term, allows students to enroll in one intensive course, pursue independent research, or complete an off-campus internship. Winter Term courses are taught by a mix of traditional faculty and special instructors.

Language schools

The Middlebury College Language Schools, which began with the establishment of the School of German in 1915, offer intensive instruction in 10 languages during six-, seven-, or eight-week summer sessions. The schools enroll about 1,350 students every summer. The Schools all use an immersion-based approach to language instruction and acquisition. All students in the Language Schools must sign and abide by Middlebury's "Language Pledge," a pledge to use their target language exclusively during the duration of their time at the School.

Undergraduate instruction, available to undergraduate students, government employees and individuals from professional backgrounds, is offered in Abenaki (as of Summer 2020, with the first accredited session taking place summer 2021), Arabic, Chinese, French, German, Hebrew, Italian, Japanese, Portuguese, Russian, Korean, and Spanish.

Middlebury's Language Schools have historically been conducted at the college's campus in Vermont. In the summer of 2009 the college opened a satellite campus at Mills College in Oakland, California to accommodate a growth in enrollment. For the summer of 2011, Middlebury at Mills will offer Arabic, French, Japanese, and Spanish instruction. Since the summer of 2015, Mills College in Oakland hosts the newly founded Middlebury School of Korean (2015), as well as the School of Arabic and the School of Italian.

Associated programs 
The Middlebury Institute of International Studies at Monterey, in Monterey, California became an affiliate of Middlebury following the signing of an affiliation agreement between the two in December 2005. The Institute currently enrolls 790 graduate students in the fields of international relations, international business, language teaching, and translation and interpretation.

The Middlebury College Language Schools offers a Doctor of Modern Languages. Unique to Middlebury, the D.M.L. prepares teacher-scholars in two modern foreign languages, helping them develop as teachers of second-language acquisition, literature, linguistics, and language pedagogy. Middlebury also offers summer language immersion programs in Arabic, Chinese, French, German, and Spanish to middle and high school students through the Middlebury-Monterey Language Academy.

The Bread Loaf School of English is based at the college's Bread Loaf Mountain campus in Ripton, just outside Middlebury, in sight of the main ridge of the Green Mountains. The poet Robert Frost is credited as a major influence on the school. Frost "first came to the School on the invitation of Dean Wilfred Davison in 1921. Friend and neighbor to Bread Loaf, (he) returned to the School every summer with but three exceptions for 42 years." Every summer since 1920, Bread Loaf has offered students from around the United States and the world intensive courses in literature, creative writing, the teaching of writing, and theater. Many prominent faculty and staff have been associated with the college. The C.V. Starr-Middlebury Schools Abroad, operated by Middlebury College in 17 countries across 5 continents, offer overseas academic programs for undergraduates from various U.S. institutions, as well as graduate-level programs for students from Middlebury College's Language Schools and the Monterey Institute of International Studies.

The Rohatyn Center for Global Affairs, was founded by Felix Rohatyn '49, investment banker, former U.S. Ambassador to France, and founder of Rohatyn Associates. Located at the Robert A. Jones '59 House, the center combines Middlebury's strengths in political, linguistic, and cultural studies to offer internationally focused symposia, lectures, and presentations.

The Center for the Comparative Study of Race and Ethnicity engages in interdisciplinary and comparative approaches for understanding formations of race and ethnicity and their effects on human relations. The Center for Social Entrepreneurship encourages students to develop innovative solutions to address society's most pressing social problems. Programs on Creativity and Innovation (PCI) is a series of initiatives designed to encourage Middlebury students to explore ideas in nonacademic settings.

Bread Loaf Writers' Conference 

In addition to the six-week summer program, Middlebury College's Bread Loaf campus is also the site of the Bread Loaf Writers' Conference for established authors, founded in 1926. It was called by The New Yorker "the oldest and most prestigious writers' conference in the country." The conference is administered by director Michael Collier and assistant director Jennifer Grotz. Many prominent members of society have been associated with the Writers' Conference.

Admissions

The Carnegie Foundation classifies Middlebury as one of the "most selective" institutions whose first-year students' test scores places these institutions in roughly the top fifth of baccalaureate institutions. For the class of 2026, the college offered admission to 1,955 students out of an applicant pool of 13,028, yielding an overall acceptance of 15%.

Middlebury enrolls around 600 students to begin in the fall semester and an additional 100 to begin in the spring. Those accepted for the fall admissions program begin the academic year in September and are referred to as "Regs." Those accepted for the spring admissions program begin the academic year in February and are referred to as "Febs." Students accepted to the Feb program use the fall semester, called a "Febmester," to travel, volunteer, enroll at other universities, or work. Febs graduate in the annual mid-year commencement at the Middlebury College Snow Bowl.

Tuition, room, and board at Middlebury is $71,830 for the 2019–20 academic year. For the class entering in 2019–20, the average financial aid grant award is $49,647.

Rankings

U.S. News & World Report ranked Middlebury as tied for 9th-best liberal arts college overall in the U.S., tied for 16th out of 63 in "Best Undergraduate Teaching", 21st out of 102 for "Best Value", and tied for 24th out of 50 "Most Innovative" among liberal arts colleges for 2021, and classifies it as "most selective." They also named Middlebury 7th in the nation for "colleges most beloved by their alumni," measured by the percentage of alumni who donate to their school, in 2012.

Washington Monthly ranked the school 8th in its 2020 liberal arts college rankings based on their contribution to the public good, as measured by social mobility, research, and promoting public service.

Kiplinger's Personal Finance places Middlebury at No. 15 in its 2019 ranking of 20 Best College Values in the U.S.

The 2016 Princeton Review includes Middlebury in "The Best 380 Colleges," and ranks the college 2nd for "Impact Schools," 3rd for "Best Science Lab Facilities," 6th for "Best College Library" and "Students Study the Most," 9th for "Their Students Love These Colleges" and "Top 50 Green Colleges," 13th for "Best Financial Aid" and "Professors Get High Marks," 15th for "Best-Run Colleges," 16th for "Best Classroom Experience," 18th for "Best Quality of Life" and "Happiest Students," 19th for "Least Religious Students," 20th for "Great Financial Aid," and 46th for "Top 50 – Colleges that Pay You Back."

The 2015 Parchment student choice college ranking, which tracks 441,822 college acceptances of thousands of students who have been accepted to multiple schools in order to reveal their preference for their chosen school compared to the other schools that admitted the student, ranks Middlebury as 9th nationally and 2nd for liberal arts colleges for student preference.

Campus

The  main campus is located in the Champlain Valley between Vermont's Green Mountains to the east and New York's Adirondack Mountains to the west. The campus is situated on a hill to the west of the village of Middlebury, a traditional New England village centered on Otter Creek Falls.

Middlebury's campus is characterized by quads and open spaces, views of the Green Mountains and the Adirondacks, and historic granite, marble, and limestone buildings. Old Stone Row, consisting of the three oldest buildings on campus—Old Chapel, Painter Hall, and Starr Hall—is listed on the National Register of Historic Places. Painter Hall, constructed in 1815, is the oldest extant college building in Vermont. Emma Willard House, a National Historic Landmark, hosts the admissions office.

Since the mid-1990s, student housing has been grouped into five residential Commons: Atwater, Brainerd, Cook, Ross, and Wonnacott. All are named for illustrious college figures. The creation of the Commons accompanied an increase in the size of the student body and an ambitious building campaign. Many new campus advancements include:
  John McCardell Jr. Bicentennial Hall, a multidisciplinary science facility built to house the Biology, Chemistry and Biochemistry, Computer Science, Geography, Geology, Physics, and Psychology departments as well as the Environmental Studies, Neuroscience, and Molecular Biology programs (1999)
  Davis Family Library (2004)
 Two Atwater Commons Residence Halls (2004)
 Atwater Dining Hall (2005)
 Hillcrest Environmental Center, an Italianate-style farmhouse constructed around 1874, has been renovated to provide a home for the environmental studies program according to LEED standards (2007)
 Starr Library, a Beaux-Arts edifice completed in 1900, now hosts the Donald Everett Axinn '51 Center for Literary and Cultural Studies at Starr Library after significant restoration of interior spaces and the addition of two wings for faculty offices, lecture halls, and a video production studio (2008)
In the fall of 1994 the President and Board of Trustees of Middlebury College adopted a "One Percent for Art" policy. This decision set aside one percent of the cost of any renovation or new construction at the college for the purchase, installation, maintenance, and interpretation of works of art publicly displayed on campus. There are 19 works in Middlebury's campus public art collection, including Frisbee, George Rickey's Two Open Rectangles, Excentric, Variation VI, Tony Smith's Smog, and a version of Robert Indiana's Love series. The collection also includes works by Dan Graham, Scott Burton, Jules Olitski, Joseph Beuys, Matt Mullican, Jenny Holzer, Christian Petersen, Buky Schwartz, George Rickey, Clement Meadmore, and Jonathan Borofsky.

Middlebury College Museum of Art
The museum opened in the Mahaney Arts Center (named after alumni Kevin P. Mahaney, '84) in 1992, designed by Hardy Holzman Pfeiffer's architectural firm. It was accredited by the American Association of Museums in 2005. The small encyclopedic collection contains Ancient, Asian, European and American art. European painters represented in this art museum include Lippo D'Andrea, Master of the Saint Ursula Legend, Govaert Flinck, Isaac Koedijk, Bartolomeo Bassante, Jean-Léon Gérôme, Giuseppe de Nittis, and Eugene Louis Gabriel Isabey. American painters represented in this art museum include William Jennys, Matthew Jouett, John Kensett, and Roy Lichtenstein. The 20th-century and contemporary collection is particularly strong in prints and photographs.

Bread Loaf Mountain Campus

The  Bread Loaf Mountain campus hosts the college's Bread Loaf School of English and the Bread Loaf Writers' Conference every summer. Middlebury owns the Robert Frost Farm, where American poet Robert Frost lived and wrote in the summer and fall months from 1939 until his death in 1963. This National Historic Landmark occupies  adjacent to the Bread Loaf campus. The Bread Loaf campus was opened as a residential living space for undergraduate students during the Fall 2021 semester in response to over-enrollment among the Class of 2026.

Middlebury College Snow Bowl

The mountain campus is the site of the Middlebury College Snow Bowl, the college-owned ski mountain, and the Carroll and Jane Rikert Ski Touring Center. Along with the Dartmouth Skiway, the Snow Bowl is one of two remaining college-owned ski areas in the eastern United States. A volunteer ski patrol, staffed by students, provides on-mountain medical services. Members are certified as Outdoor Emergency Care technicians and trained in first aid, chairlift evacuation, and toboggan handling. The Middlebury College Snow Bowl is host to ski races during the annual Middlebury Winter Carnival as well as the February mid-year graduation.

Sustainability
Middlebury recently incorporated environmental stewardship into its new mission statement.
The college is a signatory to the American College & University Presidents Climate Commitment and the Talloires Declaration. Additionally, the college has committed to be carbon neutral by 2016. Middlebury was one of only six universities to receive a grade of "A−" from the Sustainable Endowments Institute on its College Sustainability Report Card 2008, the highest grade awarded.

In the 2008–2009 academic year, Middlebury College opened a new state-of-the-art biomass plant on campus that is estimated to cut the college's carbon dioxide output by 40 percent and reduce its use of fuel oil by 50 percent.

In 2010, the Rockefeller Brothers Fund and Middlebury College announced the creation of the Sustainable Investments Initiative, a co-mingled fiscal vehicle seeking investments that generate long-term social, environmental, and economic value. The Initiative will seek investments focused specifically on sustainability issues such as clean energy, water, climate science, and green building projects, in an effort to identify businesses positioned to become a part of the worldwide shift to improve energy efficiency, decrease dependence on fossil fuels, and mitigate the effects of global climate change.

Also in 2010, Middlebury College and Integrated Energy Solutions, a Vermont developer of farm-based methane energy, agreed to explore a bio-methane gas collection and delivery system that could help Middlebury further reduce its use of fossil fuels. Middlebury has agreed to purchase bio-methane gas from IES over a 10-year period, with the agreement contingent on the college raising money to build storage facilities for the gas on campus and retrofit its current heating plant to burn the new fuel.

Student life

The 2013 Princeton Review ranks Middlebury as one of the top 20 schools in the US for "best quality of life." There are over 140 registered student organizations at Middlebury. Students register for organizations of interest during the Fall Activities Fair in September.

The Middlebury Campus is the student weekly of Middlebury College. The Campus was founded in 1900, and employs a 100% student staff. In 2019, the Middlebury Independent, a monthly journal, was established.
The Local Noodle, a satirical student publication founded in 2016, publishes multiple times a semester and maintains a consistent online presence.

WRMC-FM 91.1 is the student-volunteer-run radio station of Middlebury. WRMC broadcasts a variety of content types, including talk, news, and radio drama, although the majority of the schedule is music.

Student body

The median family income of Middlebury students is $244,300, with 53% of students coming from the top 5% highest-earning families and 14.2% from the bottom 60%. As of the 2019 school year, the student body consisted of 53% women and 47% men.

Traditions
Middlebury's Winter Carnival is the oldest student-run winter carnival in the country, started in 1923. The Winter Carnival is a weekend-long event and traditionally includes a bonfire and fireworks on the opening night, ski races at the Middlebury College Snow Bowl on Friday and Saturday, and the Winter Ball on Saturday night.

Middlebury offers a mid-year graduation for those students who complete coursework at the end of January. These students are usually "Febs," students who began their Middlebury careers as February first-years. The mid-year graduation tradition is for all graduating seniors to ski down the Middlebury College Snow Bowl in their caps and gowns to receive their diplomas.

Middlebury Outdoor Programs organizes outdoor orientations for incoming students in September and February. These orientations involve several days of hiking, rock climbing, kayaking, snowshoeing, and other activities in the wilderness around Middlebury.

Following the New Traditions Contest initiated by President Laurie Patton in the spring of 2018, Middlebury held its first Panther Day on October 20, 2018. The new tradition was held during Homecoming Weekend and included a parade of student clubs and organizations, in an effort to build school spirit. A group of student protesters lined the side of the parade route to call attention to the lack of support by the college for survivors of sexual assault. Protesters silently held signs with phrases including “We believe survivors, Midd should too” and “Green Dot is not enough” (Green Dot refers to a College initiative to train students to intervene in situations of potential sexual violence, specifically focused on parties as sites of sexual violence).

New England Review

The New England Review (NER) is a quarterly literary journal published by Middlebury College. Founded in New Hampshire in 1978 by poet, novelist, editor and professor Sydney Lea and poet Jay Parini, it was published as New England Review & Bread Loaf Quarterly from 1982 (when it moved to Middlebury College), until 1991 as a formal division of the Bread Loaf Writers' Conference. In 1991, the magazine reverted to its original name, New England Review, and opted to have only informal ties with the Writers' Conference.

NER publishes poetry, fiction, translations, and a wide variety of non-fiction in each issue. NER consistently publishes work from established writers as well as work from up-and-coming new writers. It has published work by many who have gone on to win major awards such as the Pulitzer Prize, the National Book Award, and the National Book Critics Circle Award.

Athletics

Middlebury competes in the New England Small College Athletic Conference. The Panthers lead the NESCAC in total number of National Championships, having won 33 team championships since the conference lifted its ban on NCAA play in 1994. Middlebury enjoys national success in soccer, tennis, cross country running, lacrosse, ice hockey, field hockey, and skiing, and fields 31 varsity NCAA teams and several competitive club teams. Since 2000, Middlebury's varsity squads have won 54 NESCAC titles. Currently, 28% of students participate in varsity sports.

In the early 20th century, Middlebury's traditional athletic rivals included the University of Vermont and Norwich University. In football, Middlebury is rivals with Hamilton College; the rivalry dates to 1911 and since 1980 the game between the two schools has been called the "Rocking Chair Classic," with the Mack-Jack Rocking Chair going to the winner  (Middlebury has historically dominated the rivalry).

The real-life version of Quidditch was brought to life in 2005 at Middlebury College, by Xander Manshel and Alex Benepe, who later became the first commissioner of quidditch. It has grown into its own separate and distinct sport after 15 publications of rulebooks.

The Princeton Review ranks Middlebury's athletic facilities as 18th-best in the United States.

Middlebury's athletic facilities include:
 3,500-seat Youngman Field at Alumni Stadium for football and lacrosse
 2,600-seat hockey arena
 Pepin gymnasium, home of the men's and women's basketball and volleyball teams
 Virtue Field House, including a 200-meter indoor track and 180-foot by 130-foot artificial-turf infield
 Olympic-size swimming pool
 Squash Center
 Ralph Myhre golf course
 Middlebury College Snow Bowl, the college-owned ski mountain
 Carroll and Jane Rikert Ski Touring Center at the Bread Loaf Mountain campus
 Allan Dragone Track and Field Complex
 Regulation rugby pitch
 Field Turf men's soccer field
 Henry Zee Persons Baseball Stadium

Notable people

19th Century Alumni

20th Century Alumni

21st Century Alumni

Presidents
 Jeremiah Atwater, 1800–09
 Henry Davis, 1809–18
 Joshua Bates, 1818–40
 Benjamin Labaree, 1840–66
 Harvey Denison Kitchel, 1866–75
 Calvin Butler Hulbert, 1875–80
 Cyrus Hamlin, 1880–85
 Ezra Brainerd, 1885–1908
 John Martin Thomas, 1908–21
 Paul Dwight Moody, 1921–43
 Samuel Somerville Stratton, 1943–63
 James Isbell Armstrong, 1963–75
 Olin Clyde Robison, 1975–90
 Timothy Light, 1990–91
 John McCardell Jr., 1991–2004
 Ronald D. Liebowitz, 2004–15
 Laurie L. Patton, 2015–present

See also
 List of Middlebury College buildings
 Dispatch (band)
 Dissipated Eight, a cappella ensemble
 Middlebury College Rugby Club
 Davis United World College Scholars Program

References

External links

 
 Middlebury Athletics website

 
Private universities and colleges in Vermont
Liberal arts colleges in Vermont
Educational institutions established in 1800
Education in Addison County, Vermont
Buildings and structures in Addison County, Vermont
Tourist attractions in Addison County, Vermont
Vermont culture
1800 establishments in Vermont